The KTFF Süper Lig (English: CTFA Super League), formerly known as Birinci Lig (literally First League) is the top football league in Northern Cyprus. The league was founded in 1955 and is currently contested by 16 teams.

At the end of the season, the bottom two clubs are relegated to the KTFF 1. Lig, and the next four from the bottom play play-out matches to determine the third team to be relegated.

History
The Birinci Lig was founded by six clubs in 1955. The founding members were:
Baf Ülkü Yurdu
Çetinkaya Türk SK
Doğan
Gençler Birliği
Gençlik Gücü
Mağusa Türk Gücü

Çetinkaya TSK are the most successful team with 14 championship titles.

Current teams – 2022–23 season

Champions

1955–56 – Doğan Türk Birliği
1956–57 – Doğan Türk Birliği
1957–58 – Çetinkaya
1958–59 – Doğan Türk Birliği
1959–60 – Çetinkaya
1960–61 – Çetinkaya
1961–62 – Çetinkaya
1962–63 – Küçük Kaymaklı
1963–64 – Abandoned after 5 games due to Cypriot intercommunal violence
1964–65 – Not played due to Cypriot intercommunal violence
1965–66 – Not played due to Cypriot intercommunal violence
1966–67 – Not played due to Cypriot intercommunal violence
1967–68 – Not played due to Cypriot intercommunal violence
1968–69 – Mağusa Türk Gücü
1969–70 – Çetinkaya
1970–71 – Yenicami
1971–72 – Gönyeli
1972–73 – Yenicami Ağdelen
1973–74 – Yenicami Ağdelen
1974–75 – Not played due to Turkish invasion of Cyprus
1975–76 – Yenicami Ağdelen
1976–77 – Mağusa Türk Gücü
1977–78 – Gönyeli
1978–79 – Mağusa Türk Gücü
1979–80 – Mağusa Türk Gücü
1980–81 – Gönyeli
1981–82 – Mağusa Türk Gücü
1982–83 – Mağusa Türk Gücü
1983–84 – Yenicami Ağdelen
1984–85 – Küçük Kaymaklı
1985–86 – Küçük Kaymaklı
1986–87 – Baf Ülkü Yurdu
1987–88 – Baf Ülkü Yurdu
1988–89 – Baf Ülkü Yurdu
1989–90 – Baf Ülkü Yurdu
1990–91 – Doğan Türk Birliği
1991–92 – Doğan Türk Birliği
1992–93 – Gönyeli
1993–94 – Doğan Türk Birliği
1994–95 – Gönyeli
1995–96 – Akıncılar
1996–97 – Çetinkaya
1997–98 – Çetinkaya
1998–99 – Gönyeli
1999–00 – Çetinkaya
2000–01 – Gönyeli
2001–02 – Çetinkaya
2002–03 – Binatlı
2003–04 – Çetinkaya
2004–05 – Çetinkaya
2005–06 – Mağusa Türk Gücü
2006–07 – Çetinkaya
2007–08 – Gönyeli
2008–09 – Gönyeli
2009–10 – Doğan Türk Birliği
2010–11 – Küçük Kaymaklı
2011–12 – Çetinkaya
2012–13 – Çetinkaya
2013–14 – Yenicami Ağdelen
2014–15 – Yenicami Ağdelen
2015–16 – Mağusa Türk Gücü
2016–17 – Yenicami Ağdelen
2017–18 – Yenicami Ağdelen
2018–19 – Mağusa Türk Gücü
2019–20 – Mağusa Türk Gücü
2020–21 – Not played
2021–22 – Mağusa Türk Gücü

Source:

Performance by club
Since the foundation of the First League (Birinci Lig) in 1955, nine different clubs have won the championship.

Source:

See also 
 Football in Northern Cyprus
 Football in Cyprus
 List of association football competitions

References

External links
List of champions – RSSSF
Cyprus Turkish Football Association 

 
1
North
Sports leagues established in 1955
1955 establishments in Cyprus